Schrems may refer to:

People
 Max Schrems (born 1987), Austrian activist, lawyer, and author
 Theobald Schrems (1893–1963), German choir director

Places in Austria
 Schrems, Lower Austria, a municipality
 Schrems bei Frohnleiten, Styria, a former municipality